The Vale Vikings are an Australian Rules Football team based in Vale of Glamorgan, Wales. They play in the Welsh Australian Rules Football League under the 9-a-side footy rules. The team was formerly known as the Cardiff Double Blues until 2021.

History
Cardiff Double Blues ARFC has a history of being one of the founder clubs of the Welsh Australian Rules Football League (WARFL) in 2007.

Since that date, Cardiff Double Blues ARFC has achieved considerable success. The club won the inaugural WARFL Premiership and Caerdydd Cup local derby against arch-rivals, the South Cardiff Panthers, in 2008. The club also won the first ever pre-season Cymru Clwb Cup tournament in 2009.

In March 2021, it was announced that the team would be relocating to the Vale of Glamorgan and as a result would change their name to the Vale Vikings.

Past results

2010 squad

International representation
The club has contributed significantly to the growth of Australian-rules football at an international- level in Europe by encouraging its players to strive to represent their national teams and Great Britain.
Thus far, Cardiff Double Blues ARFC players have represented the following:

Cymru Red Dragons (Welsh National Australian Rules Football Team)
English Dragonslayers (English National Australian Rules Football Team)
Great Britain Bulldogs (British Representative Team)
European Legion (European Representative Team)

See also

References

External links
Official website

2007 establishments in Wales
Australian rules football clubs in Wales
Sport in Cardiff
Australian rules football clubs established in 2007